Sangavi is a village in India, situated in the Baramati taluka on the river of nira of Pune district in the state of Maharashtra.

Administration
The village is administrated by a sarpanch, an elected representative who leads a gram panchayat. At the time of the 2011 Census of India, the gram panchayat governed three villages and was based at Sate.

Demographics
At the 2011 census, the village comprised 112 households. The population of 625 was split between 330 males and 295 females.

See also
List of villages in Mawal taluka

References

Villages in Mawal taluka